TKO Super Championship Boxing - known in Japan as  - is a boxing video game, developed by Sting Entertainment and published by SOFEL, which was released in 1992.

The former professional boxer Jirō Matsushima appears in the Japanese cover art. In 1997, he became the 56th Japanese bantamweight champion.

Version differences

TKO is the abbreviation of "Technical Knock Out". The two titles are nearly identical, however the North American and PAL Region localizations of the game contain some differences from the original Japanese version. The characters are different, in the Japanese version there is a story mode where the player controls a unique boxer, while the other 13 boxers can only be chosen in the one-player (only as an opponent) and two-player mode, the player can also change the controller buttons and set the number of rounds (only four and ten) in the options mode. In the North American and European versions, eight boxers can be chosen from the very beginning in all modes (championship, 1p and 2p), and it is possible to choose one to ten rounds and set the difficulty level through the options.

See also
 Teiken Boxing Gym
 Masato (kickboxer)
 Hideyuki Ohashi
 Takanori Gomi

References

External links
 Kentou-Ou World Champion at superfamicom.org
 Kentou-Ou World Champion at super-famicom.jp 

1992 video games
Boxing video games
SOFEL games
Sting Entertainment games
Super Nintendo Entertainment System games
Super Nintendo Entertainment System-only games
Fighting games
Video games developed in Japan
Multiplayer and single-player video games